Frank Lee may refer to:

Frank Lee (British politician) (1867–1941), British Labour Party politician
Frank Lee (cricketer) (1905–1982), English cricketer
Frank H. Lee (1873–1952), U.S. Representative from Missouri
Frank Lee (rugby league), rugby league footballer who played in the 1900s and 1910s for England, Lancashire, St Helens RLFC, and York
Frank Godbould Lee (1903–1971), British public servant and Master of Corpus Christi College, Cambridge
Frank Lee, the stage name for Lee Tung Foo

See also
Francis Lee (disambiguation)
Frank Lees (1931–1999), English chemical engineer